Randall Faye (July 26, 1892 – December 5, 1948) was an American screenwriter, film producer, and director. He wrote for 64 films between 1926 and 1947. He died in Orange County, California.

Selected filmography

 Upstream (1927)
 Rich But Honest (1927)
 Sharp Shooters (1928)
 Don't Marry (1928)
 Woman Wise (1928)
 Branded (1931)
 Texas Cyclone (1932)
 McKenna of the Mounted (1932)
 High Society (1932)
 Her Imaginary Lover (1933)
 Call Me Mame (1933)
 As Good as New (1933)
 Cash (1933, producer)
 Murder at the Inn (1934)
 Father and Son (1934)
 The Office Wife (1934)
 Handle with Care (1935)
 Lend Me Your Husband (1935)
 The Man Without a Face (1935)
 Gay Old Dog (1935)
 Born That Way (1936)
 If I Were Rich (1936)
 Such Is Life (1936)
 The Vandergilt Diamond Mystery (1936)
 Luck of the Turf (1936)
 This Green Hell (1936)
 Mr Stringfellow Says No (1937)
 The Return of the Vampire (1943)
 Scotland Yard Investigator (1945)
 The Fabulous Suzanne (1946)
 The Ghost Goes Wild (1947)

External links

1892 births
1948 deaths
American male screenwriters
American film producers
American film directors
20th-century American male writers
20th-century American screenwriters